Bosara festivata is a moth in the family Geometridae. It is found on Sulawesi, Seram, Bali and Borneo.

Adults have pale orange-brown wings.

References

Moths described in 1903
Eupitheciini
Moths of Indonesia